Włodawka is a Polish river passing by the town of Włodawa. It flows into the Bug River. Włodawka is 31 km long.

Rivers of Poland
Rivers of Lublin Voivodeship